Donzell McDonald (born February 20, 1975) is a former outfielder who played parts of two seasons in Major League Baseball from 2001 to 2002.

Early life 
Born in Long Beach, California, McDonald grew up in Fort Collins, Colorado.  He attended Cherry Creek High School, then went on to Trinidad Community College and later moved to Yavapai College with coach Nino Giarratano.

Professional career 
Donzell was drafted by the New York Yankees in the 22nd round, 618th overall, in the 1995 Major League Baseball draft. The switch hitting center fielder was known for his speed; twice he stole over 50 bases in the minor leagues, and six times stole more than 30.

He made his major league debut in 2001. He played 5 games with the Yankees that year, getting one hit in three at bats, he would also appear in ten games for the Kansas City Royals in 2002. He was last in the Yankees farm system in 2004, after being in the Cleveland Indians, Kansas City Royals, and Atlanta Braves farm systems. He  played for several seasons in the Mexican League and different independent leagues, last appearing in a professional game in 2010 when he played center field for Acereros de Monclova.

Personal
McDonald resides in Arizona and currently serves as a pro scout/roving coach for the Texas Rangers organization.

Donzell is the older brother of former outfielder Darnell McDonald and cousin of former pitcher James McDonald.

Honors and awards
1996 New York–Penn League All-Star Team

Sources

External links
, or Retrosheet, or Pelota Binaria (Venezuelan Winter League)

1975 births
Living people
Acereros de Monclova players
Acereros del Norte players
African-American baseball players
Algodoneros de Guasave players
American expatriate baseball players in Canada
American expatriate baseball players in Mexico
Baseball players from Long Beach, California
Cañeros de Los Mochis players
Caribes de Oriente players
American expatriate baseball players in Venezuela
Columbus Clippers players
Fargo-Moorhead RedHawks players
Gulf Coast Yankees players
Indios de Mayagüez players
Leones de Yucatán players
Kansas City Royals players
Major League Baseball left fielders
Mayos de Navojoa players
Mexican League baseball center fielders
New York Yankees players
Newark Bears players
Norwich Navigators players
Olmecas de Tabasco players
Omaha Royals players
Oneonta Yankees players
Pastora de los Llanos players
Richmond Braves players
Tampa Yankees players
Trinidad State Trojans baseball players
Venados de Mazatlán players
Winnipeg Goldeyes players
Yavapai Roughriders baseball players
21st-century African-American sportspeople
20th-century African-American sportspeople